Yves Détraigne (born 21 December 1954 in Reims, Marne) is a French politician and a member of the Senate of France. He represents the Marne department and is a member of the Centrist Alliance.

References
 Page on the Senate website
 Official website

1954 births
Living people
Politicians from Reims
École nationale d'administration alumni
Union for French Democracy politicians
Democratic Movement (France) politicians
Centrist Alliance politicians
French Senators of the Fifth Republic
Union of Democrats and Independents politicians
Senators of Marne (department)
Mayors of places in Grand Est